Tulipa cuspidata can refer to:

Tulipa cuspidata Regel, a synonym of Tulipa sylvestris subsp. primulina (Baker) Maire & Weiller
Tulipa cuspidata Stapf, a synonym of Tulipa systola Stapf